Carlaw Park was a multi-purpose stadium in Parnell, a central suburb of Auckland, New Zealand. It neighboured the Auckland Domain's Northern end. It was primarily used for rugby league and had a peak spectator capacity of around 28,000 in the 1930s, though this fell to around 17,000 by the time the ground was closed in 2002.

History
The stadium's grandstands and terraces were built in 1916, and it became the home of rugby league in Auckland from 1921. It was named after James Carlaw, the chairman of the Auckland Rugby League managing committee who secured the land in 1920 and developed the ground further.

The ground was officially opened on 25 June 1921 and City Rovers defeated Maritime 10–8 on the opening day in front of 7,000 fans. Herb Lunn scored the first try and Eric Grey kicked the first goal on the ground.

The ground hosted the sole test match in the New Zealand leg of the 1951 French rugby league tour of Australasia.

The Auckland Rugby League spent £4,322 on capital expenditure in developing the ground. The ground was purchased for $200,000 in 1974.

The ground hosted 3 Winfield Cup games (one in 1992 the two other games were held in 1993) with the first game between Newcastle and Manly Warringah attracting 17,368 spectators. Strong attendances across these matches led to the inclusion of the Auckland Warriors into the Winfield Cup in 1995.

During its long history it hosted many matches in various Rugby League World Cups. The stadium capacity was officially listed as 17,000 when it closed in 2002 due to health and safety reasons. Between 1924 and 1999 Carlaw Park hosted sixty-six Test matches. The largest Test crowd was an estimated 28,000 during the 1928 England tour. New Zealand won the game, defeating England 17–13. The final rugby league test at the ground came on 22 October 1999 when New Zealand defeated Tonga 74–0 in front of the ground's lowest ever test crowd of 4,528.

Later years
In August 2006 the Auckland Rugby League reached an agreement to lease the property off to be developed as a retirement home. No development has started as of August 2007.  However the site has been officially 'handed over' in August 2007 in a ceremony involving Prime Minister Helen Clark.

Carlaw Park was one of the venues under consideration for Stadium New Zealand, a proposed stadium to host the 2011 Rugby World Cup. Complications over the lease of the property, the requirement for additional land to be taken from Auckland Domain, and the proximity of the heavy traffic on Stanley Street led to other options being preferred by the Government. The backers of Carlaw Park hosting the Cup secured NZ$200 million for its possible development, but the government finally chose Eden Park to host the World Cup games.

Carlaw Park is now the site of several offices, a Quest Apartments hotel building, and the University of Auckland's largest student accommodation Carlaw Park Student Village. Since mid-November 2018, Carlaw Park has been connected by a walkway to the Parnell railway station.

Rugby league test matches
List of rugby league test matches played at Carlaw Park.

Rugby League World Cup
List of Rugby League World Cup matches played at Carlaw Park.Results are from the 1968, 1975, 1977 and 1985–1988 World Cups.

References

Rugby League World Cup stadiums
Defunct rugby league venues in New Zealand
Sports venues in Auckland
Multi-purpose stadiums in New Zealand
Auckland Domain
Parnell, New Zealand